Alexandra Gamlemshaug Andresen (born 23 July 1996) is a Norwegian heiress. She became the world's youngest billionaire at age 19 in 2016 and held the position of youngest billionaire on the Forbes list for three consecutive years. As of 2020, Andresen is the world's second-youngest billionaire and her net worth is estimated at US$1.1 billion.

Early life
Andresen is the daughter of Norwegian industrialist Johan H. Andresen Jr., owner of Ferd AS, who in 2007, transferred ownership stakes of 42.2% each to Alexandra and her sister Katharina (even though their father insists that he will not force his daughters to take part in the family company if they do not want to).

She is the great-granddaughter of Johan H. Andresen, great-great granddaughter of Johan Henrik Andresen and Anton Klaveness, and great-great-great granddaughter of Nicolai Andresen. Johan Henrik was the brother of Nicolay August Andresen, and the uncle of Nils August Andresen Butenschøn.

Career
Andresen has won multiple awards and honors in horse dressage competitions, and has modeled several times for equestrian clothing company KingsLand.

References

1996 births
Living people
Female billionaires
Norwegian billionaires
Norwegian dressage riders
Norwegian female equestrians